John Pontifex (1 July 1771 – 1 September 1841) was an English amateur cricketer who made 11 appearances in first-class cricket matches from 1804 to 1810. He was a member of the Marylebone Cricket Club (MCC) and played for the Gentlemen in the first two Gentlemen v Players matches in 1806.

References

1771 births
1841 deaths
Gentlemen cricketers
English cricketers
English cricketers of 1787 to 1825
Marylebone Cricket Club cricketers
Non-international England cricketers
Middlesex cricketers